is a railway station on the Iwate Ginga Railway Line in Ninohe, Iwate Prefecture, Japan, operated by the third-sector railway operator Iwate Ginga Railway Company.

Lines
Tomai Station is served by the Iwate Ginga Railway Line, and is located 73.7 kilometers from the terminus of the line at Morioka Station and 609.0 kilometers from Tokyo Station.

Station layout
Tomai Station has two opposed side platforms connected by an underground passage. There is no station building, but only small shelters on the platforms. The station is unattended.

Platforms

Adjacent stations

History
The station opened on 1 October 1966. The station was absorbed into the JR East network upon the privatization of Japanese National Railways (JNR) on 1 April 1987, and was transferred to the Iwate Ginga Railway on 1 September 2002.

Passenger statistics
In fiscal 2015, the station was used by an average of 143 passengers daily.

Surrounding area
  National Route 4
Mabechi River

See also
 List of railway stations in Japan

References

External links

 Tomai Station information 

Railway stations in Iwate Prefecture
Iwate Galaxy Railway Line
Railway stations in Japan opened in 1966
Ninohe, Iwate